A bicycle chain is a roller chain that transfers power from the pedals to the drive-wheel of a bicycle, thus propelling it. Most bicycle chains are made from plain carbon or alloy steel, but some are nickel-plated to prevent rust, or simply for aesthetics.

History
Obsolete chain designs previously used on bicycles included the block chain, the skip-link chain, and the Simpson lever chain. The first chains were of a simple, bushing-less design. These had inherent reliability problems and a bit more friction (and mechanical efficiency losses) than modern chains. With these limitations in mind, the Nevoigt brothers, of the German Diamant Bicycle Company, designed the roller chain in 1898, which uses bushings. More recently, the "bushingless roller chain" design has superseded the bushed chain. This design incorporates the bearing surface of the bushing into the inner side plate, with each plate creating half of the bushing. This reduces the number of parts needed to assemble the chain and reduces cost. The chain is also more flexible sideways, which is needed for modern derailleur gearing, because the chainline is not always straight in all gear selections.

The first solid bush-roller patent was filed by the Renold Chain company in 1880.

Early examples of chain-driven bicycles include the 1869 Guillemot and Meyer, the 1879 Lawson, the 1884 McCammon, the 1884 Starley Rover, and the 1895 Diamant.

Before the safety bicycle, bicycles did not have chains and the pedals were typically attached directly to the drive-wheel, thus limiting top speed by the diameter of the wheel and resulting in designs with front wheels as large as possible. Various linkage mechanisms were invented to raise the effective gear ratio, but with limited success. Using chain drive allowed the mechanical advantage between the drive and driven sprockets to determine the maximum speed, thereby enabling manufacturers to reduce the size of the driving wheel for safety. It also allowed for the development of variable gearing, allowing cyclists to adjust their gearing on the fly, to terrain or road inclination and their strength, obtaining an efficient and workable cadence at various speeds.

Efficiency
A bicycle chain can be very energy efficient: one study reported efficiencies as high as 98.6%. The study, performed in a clean laboratory environment, found that efficiency was not greatly affected by the state of lubrication. A larger sprocket will give a more efficient drive because it moves the point of pressure farther away from the axle, placing less stress on the bearings, thus reducing friction in the inner wheel. Higher chain tension was found to be more efficient: "This is actually not in the direction you'd expect, based simply on friction".

Maintenance

How best to lubricate a bicycle chain is a commonly debated question among cyclists. Liquid lubricants penetrate to the inside of the links and are not easily displaced, but quickly attract dirt. "Dry" lubricants, often containing wax or Teflon, are transported by an evaporating solvent, and stay cleaner in use. The cardinal rule for long chain life is never to lubricate a dirty chain, as this washes abrasive particles into the rollers. Chains should be cleaned before lubrication. The chain should be wiped dry after the lubricant has had enough time to penetrate the links. An alternative approach is to change the (relatively cheap) chain very frequently; then proper care is less important. Some utility bicycles have fully enclosing chain guards, which virtually eliminate chain wear and maintenance. On recumbent bicycles the chain is often run through tubes to prevent it from picking up dirt, and to keep the cyclist's leg free from oil and dirt.

Removal

On most upright bicycles, the chain loops through the right rear triangle made by the right chain stay and seat tube. Thus a chain must be separated, (or "broken" ) unless the triangle can be split (usually the seat stay). Chain can either be broken with a chain tool or at a master link. A master link, also known as a connecting link, allows the chain to be inserted or removed with simpler tools, or even no tools, for cleaning or replacement.

Some newer chain designs, such as Shimano and Campagnolo 10-speed chains, require a special replacement pin to be used when installing or reinstalling a separated chain. An alternative to this process is to install a master link, such as a SRAM Power Link or a Wippermann Connex.

Wear

Chain wear, often misleadingly called chain stretch, becomes an issue with extensive cycling. The wear is removal of material from the bushings and pins (or half-bushings, in the Sedis design, also, called "bushing-less", where the bushing is part of the inner plate) rather than elongation of the sideplates. The tension created by pedaling is insufficient to cause the latter. Because the spacing from link to link on a worn chain is longer than the  specification, those links will not precisely fit the spaces between teeth on the sprockets, resulting in increased wear on the sprockets and possibly chain skip on derailleur drive trains, in which pedaling tension causes the chain to slide up over the tops of the sprocket teeth and skip to the next alignment, that reduces power transfer and makes pedaling uncomfortable.

Since chain wear is strongly aggravated by dirt getting into the links, the lifetime of a chain depends mostly on how well it is cleaned and lubricated, and does not depend on the mechanical load.

Nickel-plated chain also confers a measure of self-lubrication to its moving parts as nickel is a relatively non-galling metal.

Chain wear rates are highly variable. One way to measure wear is with a ruler or machinist's rule. Another is with a chain wear tool, which typically has a "tooth" of about the same size found on a sprocket. They are placed on a chain under light load, and if the tooth drops in all the way, the chain should be replaced.

Twenty half-links in a new chain measure , and replacement is recommended before the old chain measures  (0.7% wear). A more conservative limit is when 24 half-links in the old chain measure  (0.5% wear). If the chain has worn beyond this limit, the rear sprockets are also likely to wear, in extreme cases followed by the front chainrings. In this case, the 'skipping' mentioned above is liable to continue even after the chain is replaced, as the teeth of the sprockets will have become unevenly worn (in extreme cases, hook-shaped). Replacing worn sprocket cassettes and chainrings after missing the chain replacement window is much more expensive than simply replacing a worn chain.

Sizes

The chain in use on modern bicycles has a  pitch, which is the distance from one pin center to another, ANSI standard #40, where the 4 in "#40" indicates the pitch of the chain in eighths of an inch; and ISO standard 606 (metric) #8, where the 8 indicates the pitch in sixteenths of an inch.

The Shimano 10 pitch system is incompatible with ANSI standard #40 (1/2") e.g. chains, sprockets and so on, and was outlawed by the Japan Keirin Association, helping in its demise.

Width
Fixed sprockets and freewheels are also available in  widths so fixed-gear and single-speed bikes can be set up to use the narrower and lighter  chains.

With derailleur equipped bicycles, the external width of the chain (measured at the connecting rivet) also matters, because chains must not be too wide for the cogset or they will rub on the next larger sprocket, or too narrow that they might fall between two sprockets. Chains can also be identified by the number of rear sprockets they can support, anywhere from 3 to 13, and the list below enables measuring a chain of unknown origin to determine its suitability.

 6 speed – 7.3 mm (9⁄32 in) (Shimano HG), 7.1 mm (9⁄32 in) (SRAM, Shimano IG)
 7 speed –  (Shimano HG),  (SRAM, Shimano IG)
 8 speed –  (Shimano HG),  (SRAM, Shimano IG)
 9 speed –  (all brands)
 10 speed –  (Shimano, Campagnolo)
 10 speed (Narrow) –  (Campagnolo, KMC)
 10 speed (Narrow, Direction) –  (Shimano CN-5700, CN-6700, CN-7900)
 11 speed –  (Campagnolo, KMC, Shimano CN-9000)
 12 speed -  (SRAM) 
 13 speed - 4.9mm wide - Campagnolo Ekar

The Wikibook, "Bicycle Maintenance and Repair", has more details on this topic.

Length
New chains usually come in a stock length, long enough for most upright bike applications. The appropriate number of links must be removed before installation in order for the drive train to function properly. The pin connecting links can be pushed out with a chain tool to shorten, and additional links may be added to lengthen.

In the case of derailleur gears the chain is usually long enough so that it can be shifted onto the largest front chain ring and the largest rear sprocket without jamming, and not so long that, when shifted onto the smallest front chain ring and the smallest rear sprocket, the rear derailleur cannot take up all the slack. Meeting both these requirements is only possible if the rear derailleur is compatible with the gear range being used on the bike. It is broadly accepted as inadvisable to actually use the large/large and small/small gear combinations, a practice known as cross-chaining, due to chain stress and wear.

In the case of single-speed bicycles and hub gears, the chain length must match the distance between crank and rear hub and the sizes of the front chain ring and rear sprocket. These bikes usually have some mechanism for small adjustments such as horizontal dropouts, track ends, or an eccentric mechanism in the rear hub or the bottom bracket. In extreme cases, a chain half-link may be necessary.

Variations
In order to reduce weight, chains have been manufactured with hollow pins and with cut-outs in the links. Chains have also been made of stainless steel for corrosion resistance and titanium for weight reduction, but they are expensive. A recent trend is chains of various colors, and at least one manufacturer offers a chain model specifically for electric bicycles.

Manufacturers
Notable bicycle chain manufacturers include:
Renold
Campagnolo
Rohloff AG
KMC Chain
Shimano
SRAM
Wippermann

See also
 Bicycle gearing
 Chainless bicycles

References

External links
Wikibooks Bicycle Maintenance and Repair – see the section on Chains
Animation of Shimano gearing system

Chain drives
Chain
Mechanical power control
19th-century introductions

it:Catena (meccanica)#Bicicletta